Zogaj is a village in the former municipality of Bytyç in Kukës County, Albania. At the 2015 local government reform it became a part of the municipality Tropojë. There are several chromium mines near the village.

References

Populated places in Tropojë
Villages in Kukës County